Anthony Newman may refer to:

 Anthony Newman (American football) (born 1965), retired American football defensive back
 Anthony Newman (musician) (born 1941), American classical musician

See also 
 Tony Newman (disambiguation)